Mövenpick Ambassador Hotel, formerly known as the Ambassador Hotel, is a five-star luxury hotel located in Accra, the capital of Ghana, set in West Ridge,  from Kotoka International Airport.

History 
The Ambassador Hotel was originally established by the United Kingdom as a gift to the Ghanaian government on the attainment of independence in 1957.

The heritage building was demolished to give way to the establishment of a new five-star luxury hotel in 2006.

Location and description 
The Mövenpick Ambassador Hotel Accra is located within the city's Central Business District a few kilometres away from Kotoka International Airport, Accra. The hotel is located close to the Accra Financial Centre, World Trade Centre, International Conference Centre and government ministries. The hotel also has the largest swimming-pool in Accra and an emporium attached to it, with shops and other businesses.

References 

1957 establishments in Ghana
Hotels in Africa